Antto Hilska (born 22 September 1993) is a Finnish football player.

References
  Profile at fcjjk.fi
  Profile at veikkausliiga.com

1993 births
Living people
Finnish footballers
Finland youth international footballers
Finland under-21 international footballers
Association football forwards
Tampereen Pallo-Veikot players
JJK Jyväskylä players
FC Ilves players
FC Haka players
Veikkausliiga players
Ykkönen players
Kakkonen players
Footballers from Tampere